Jennifer Billingsley is a retired American television and film actress.

Early years
The daughter of Army Col. Claude Augustus Billingsley, she was born in Honolulu, Hawaii and relocated often as an "Army brat", attending schools in Vienna and Chicago, and graduating with honors from Fort Smith Senior High School in Arkansas. She has one sister.

Career
Billingsley's stage debut came in Detroit, Michigan, and she debuted on Broadway in the musical Carnival! Her film debut came as James Caan's girlfriend in the 1964 thriller, Lady in a Cage, and she appeared in the romantic drama, The Young Lovers that same year. She had a recurring role on the daytime soap opera, General Hospital and prominent roles in such films as The Spy with My Face (1965), C.C. and Company (1970), Brute Corps (1971), Welcome Home, Soldier Boys (1972), White Lightning (1973), The Thirsty Dead (1974) and Hollywood Man (1976). 
 
Billingsley's guest spots on TV included Cimarron Strip, Naked City, Gunsmoke, Route 66, The Adventures of Ozzie and Harriet, Dr. Kildare, The Lieutenant, Wagon Train, The Man from U.N.C.L.E., Mannix, The F.B.I., Hawaii Five-O, Police Story, Alice, Baretta, and The Amazing Spider-Man.

Personal life
Billingsley married Stephen N. Gerlach, better known as musician Jesse Lee Kincaid, who played classical guitar and composed music. The union later ended in divorce.

References

Further reading

External links

Living people
20th-century American actresses
American musical theatre actresses
American television actresses
American film actresses
American expatriates in Austria
Year of birth missing (living people)
21st-century American women